The Rutog Town,
called Rituzhen in Chinese, 
is a town and the seat of Rutog County in the far western Tibet Autonomous Region. It is also a major military base for China near the disputed border with India allowing it to press its claims militarily.

The town was built around in 1999 by the Chinese administration of Tibet on the China National Highway 219. Prior to that, the seat of the county was at Rudok or Rutog Dzong, about 10 km northwest, which had been its capital for more than a thousand years.

The new Rutog Town is located 120 kilometres by road northwest of Shiquanhe (also called Ali or Ngari) and 10 kilometres south of Lake Pangong. The town has a population of about 1000 people.

Town and garrison 
Prior to the construction of the town around 1999, the location contained a small Gyelgosang community of the Derub village. Lacking a river of its own, it is watered by a canal dug from the Maga Tsangpo river at Derub.

Tibetologist Gyurme Dorje states that the newly built town is basically a Chinese military garrison, as does the Lonely Planet guide. The town serves as a base for China's military operations against India along the disputed Sino-Indian border in Ladakh and the associated "salami tactics".

Normally able to accommodate 5,000 troops, the camp's capacity was expanded to house 15,000 to 18,000 troops by 2021. Satellite imagery indicated that China broke ground in August 2019, and started extending the facilities in the waterless valley to the northeast of the town. New garrison facilities, radar stations, surface-to-air missile sites, heliports and tank drills have been constructed.

Township 
The extended township of Rutog contains the Old Rudok town and the valley of Shaldat and Spanggur lakes towards the Ladakh border. It is bounded in the north by the Pangong lake and in the south by the Maga Tsangpo basin. The valley contains villages such as Chulung 'Ogma, Recho (or Retso) and Shingzhang at the southeastern end of Spanggur Lake.

Transportation 
The China National Highway 219 (G219) connects Rutog to Shiquanhe, the capital of the Ngari Prefecture, Gar Günsa, the home of Ngari Gunsa Airport, and other venues to the southeast. In the north, the highway passes through the disputed Aksai Chin region and goes to Kashgar. The Lonely Planet guide mentioned in 1999 that the visitors coming from Kashgar were required to have a permit to enter Rutog.

At Derub, a road called Musi Xian branches off from G219 towards the Spanggur Lake near the Indian border. Yeban Xian branches off from Musi Xian near Shaldat Lake and heads to the Indus Valley and, via Demchok, into the Tsamda County. At the northeastern end of the Pangong Lake, another offshoot of G219 called Banying Xian heads to the Chinese military base at Kongka La.

In addition, China has recently started constructing a bridge over the Pangong Lake near the Khurnak Plain. This is intended to link up Musi Xian and Banying Xian, so that China can move troops and resources speedily across the two sides of the Pangong Lake.

See also
List of towns and villages in Tibet

Notes

References

Bibliography
 
 

Populated places in Ngari Prefecture
Township-level divisions of Tibet
Pangong Lake
Rutog County